Another Setting is the third studio album by English band The Durutti Column, released in August 1983.

Track listing 
All music written by Vini Reilly.

A1. "Prayer" - 3:09
A2. "Response" - 3:16
A3. "Bordeaux" - 2:13
A4. "For a Western" - 2:26
A5. "The Beggar" - 2:06
B1. "Francesca" - 3:37
B2. "Smile in the Crowd" - 3:45
B3. "You've Heard It Before" - 3:33
B4. "Dream of a Child" - 2:56
B5. "Second Family" - 3:26
B6. "Spent Time" - 2:44

2015 Factory Benelux reissue (FBN-30-CD):

 "Prayer"
 "Response"
 "Bordeaux"
 "For a Western"
 "The Beggar"
 "Francesca"
 "Smile in the Crowd"
 "You've Heard It Before"
 "Dream of a Child"
 "Second Family"
 "Spent Time"
 "I Get Along Without You Very Well"
 "Love Fading"
 "For Noriko"
 "Bordeaux" (live at WOMAD)
 "The Beggar" (live at La Cigale)
 "Piece for Out of Tune Grande Piano"

2018, April 21 Factory Benelux Record Store Day reissue (FBN 30 limited edition of 800 copies includes exclusive live disc in clear vinyl):

A1. "Prayer"
A2. "Response"
A3. "Bordeaux"
A4. "For a Western"
A5. "The Beggar"
B1. "Francesca"
B2. "Smile in the Crowd"
B3. "You've Heard It Before"
B4. "Dream of a Child"
B5. "Second Family"
B6. "Spent Time"
C1. "Sketch for Dawn" (live)
C2. "Sketch for Summer" (live)
C3. "Conduct" (live)
C4. "Pauline" (live)
C5. "Jacqueline" (live)
D1. "Stains" (live)
D2. "Estoril a Noite" (live)
D3. "The Beggar" (live)
D4. "I Get Along Without You Very Well"

The core album on disc 1 and a previously unreleased live performance from Pandora's Box Festival in Rotterdam (2 September 1983) on disc 2. The gatefold sleeve is printed on white matt board. Includes a download code for a digital copy of the vinyl tracks.

Personnel 
 The Durutti Column
 Vini Reilly – instruments
with:
 Bruce Mitchell - percussion
 Simon Topping - trumpet
 Maunagh Fleming - cor anglais
Technical
Mark Farrow - graphic design
Jackie Williams - paintings, artwork
Ged Murray - photography

Legacy 
In 1989, primary Depeche Mode songwriter Martin L. Gore released a cover of "Smile in the Crowd" on his first solo release, Counterfeit e.p.

External links

References

1983 albums
The Durutti Column albums
Factory Records albums